Events in the year 2005 in Japan.

Incumbents
 Emperor: Akihito
 Prime Minister: Junichiro Koizumi (L–Kanagawa)
 Chief Cabinet Secretary: Hiroyuki Hosoda (L–Shimane) to October 31, Shinzo Abe (L–Yamaguchi)
 Chief Justice of the Supreme Court: Akira Machida
 President of the House of Representatives: Yōhei Kōno (L–Kanagawa) to August 8 and again from September 21
 President of the House of Councillors: Chikage Ōgi (L–proportional)
 Diet sessions: 162nd (regular, January 21 to August 8), 163rd (special, September 26 to November 1) – 162nd and 163rd Diet are also often referred to as yūsei kokkai, "postal Diet"

Governors
Aichi Prefecture: Masaaki Kanda 
Akita Prefecture: Sukeshiro Terata 
Aomori Prefecture: Shingo Mimura
Chiba Prefecture: Akiko Dōmoto 
Ehime Prefecture: Moriyuki Kato 
Fukui Prefecture: Issei Nishikawa 
Fukuoka Prefecture: Wataru Asō 
Fukushima Prefecture: Eisaku Satō
Gifu Prefecture: Taku Kajiwara (until 5 February); Hajime Furuta (starting 6 February)
Gunma Prefecture: Hiroyuki Kodera 
Hiroshima Prefecture: Yūzan Fujita 
Hokkaido: Harumi Takahashi
Hyogo Prefecture: Toshizō Ido
Ibaraki Prefecture: Masaru Hashimoto 
Ishikawa Prefecture: Masanori Tanimoto
Iwate Prefecture: Hiroya Masuda 
Kagawa Prefecture: Takeki Manabe 
Kagoshima Prefecture: Satoshi Mitazono 
Kanagawa Prefecture: Shigefumi Matsuzawa 
Kochi Prefecture: Daijiro Hashimoto 
Kumamoto Prefecture: Yoshiko Shiotani 
Kyoto Prefecture: Keiji Yamada 
Mie Prefecture: Akihiko Noro 
Miyagi Prefecture: Shirō Asano (until 21 November); Yoshihiro Murai (starting 21 November)
Miyazaki Prefecture: Tadahiro Ando 
Nagano Prefecture: Yasuo Tanaka 
Nagasaki Prefecture: Genjirō Kaneko 
Nara Prefecture: Yoshiya Kakimoto
Niigata Prefecture: Hirohiko Izumida 
Oita Prefecture: Katsusada Hirose
Okayama Prefecture: Masahiro Ishii 
Okinawa Prefecture: Keiichi Inamine
Osaka Prefecture: Fusae Ōta 
Saga Prefecture: Yasushi Furukawa 
Saitama Prefecture: Kiyoshi Ueda 
Shiga Prefecture: Yoshitsugu Kunimatsu 
Shiname Prefecture: Nobuyoshi Sumita 
Shizuoka Prefecture: Yoshinobu Ishikawa 
Tochigi Prefecture: Tomikazu Fukuda
Tokushima Prefecture: Kamon Iizumi
Tokyo: Shintarō Ishihara 
Tottori Prefecture: Yoshihiro Katayama 
Toyama Prefecture: Takakazu Ishii 
Wakayama Prefecture: Yoshiki Kimura 
Yamagata Prefecture: Kazuo Takahashi (until 13 February); Hiroshi Saitō (starting 14 February)
Yamaguchi Prefecture: Sekinari Nii 
Yamanashi Prefecture: Takahiko Yamamoto

Events

January
 January 1: The statute of limitations for murder cases is extended from 15 to 25 years.

February
 February 17: Chubu Centrair International Airport opens.

March
 March 2: A Nanpū express train on the Tosa Kuroshio Railway Sukumo Line derails and crashes into Sukumo Station, killing the train driver.
 March 16: The Shimane Prefecture assembly declares "Takeshima Day" to commemorate the centennial anniversary of Japan's claim to Liancourt Rocks (known as Takeshima in Japan, and Dokdo in Korea), starting a wave of protests in South Korea.
 March 20: 2005 Fukuoka earthquake

 March 25: 
 Expo 2005 opens in Aichi Prefecture. 
 Lazytown premieres on TV Asahi, but it was not a success, airing its last on that channel 2 weeks later before moving to NHK General Television.

April
 April 1
 Shizuoka City is designated by government ordinance.
 The Japan-Mexico free trade agreement becomes effective
 Tokyo Metropolitan University is established.
 April 20: A magnitude 5.8 earthquake hits Fukuoka Prefecture, injuring 56.
 April 25: 107 commuters are killed, 562 injured in the Amagasaki rail crash near Osaka.

May
 May 3: A Shizuoka Prefecture police helicopter crashes in Shizuoka city, killing five police officers who were on board.

June
 June 23
 60th anniversary of the Battle of Okinawa - a ceremony to remember the dead is held at the Okinawa Prefectural Peace Park.
 The first case of the H5N2 virus in Japan is discovered on a chicken farm in Jōsō, Ibaraki.

July
 July 15: Two tankers collide in the Kumano Sea, with one bursting into flames, resulting in one death.

August
 August 8: Postal service privatization, the keystone of Prime Minister Koizumi's platform, is voted down in the House of Councillors. Later in the day, Koizumi announces the dissolution of the House of Representatives and snap elections to be held the following month.7
 August 24: The Tsukuba Express line opens.

September
 September 11: Following a general election, the Liberal Democratic Party wins the largest House of Representatives majority in postwar history, holding a two-thirds supermajority along with coalition partner New Komeito.
 September 17: Seiji Maehara defeats Naoto Kan for the presidency of the Democratic Party of Japan.
 September 21: Koizumi is re-elected as prime minister at an extraordinary session of the Diet.
 September 25: Expo 2005 ends.

October
 October 1: Mitsubishi UFJ Financial Group is formed by the merger of two Japanese banking conglomerates.
 October 14: The Postal Privatisation Bill enters the Diet.
 October 17: Koizumi visits Yasukuni Shrine for the first time since 2004.
 October 31: Koizumi reshuffles his cabinet, naming Shinzo Abe as Chief Cabinet Secretary, Heizo Takenaka as Minister of Internal Affairs and Taro Aso as Minister of Foreign Affairs.

November
 November 15: Princess Sayako marries commoner Yoshiki Kuroda, thus giving up her imperial title.
 November 17: Structural Calculation Forgery Problem is discovered, and it becomes a serious social problem.

December
 December 25: An express train bound for the city of Niigata, Niigata Prefecture derails due to strong winds in Shonai, Yamagata Prefecture, killing 5 and injuring at least 33.

Date unknown
Japanese official abandoned national project and development of superconducting passenger ferry Techno Superliner, due to high fuel cost.

Births
 February 10: Rio Suzuki, actress and tarento 
 June 17: Funa Nakayama, Olympic skateboarder
 October 4: Rina Endō, actress

Deaths
 January 4: Kishibe Shigeo, musicologist (born 1912)
 January 14: Takeshi Suzuki, professor of Urdu (born 1932)
 January 16: Yoshito Matsushige, photojournalist (born 1913)
 January 23: Mutsuko Sakura, actress (born 1921)
 February 19: Kihachi Okamoto, film director (born 1924)
 February 28: Yukio Koshimori, politician (born 1930)
 March 6: Sadako Kurihara, poet (born 1913)
 March 22: Kenzo Tange, architect (born 1913)
 April 20: Fumio Niwa, author (born 1904)
 May 23: Tetsuya Ishida, painter (born 1973)
 June: Satoru Anabuki, flying ace (born 1921)
 June 10: Yumiko Kurahashi, writer (born 1935)
 June 28: Yumika Hayashi, AV idol and pink film actress (born 1970)
 July 11: Shinya Hashimoto, wrestler (born 1965)
 July 16: Gu, Prince Imperial Hoeun (born 1931)
 July 19: Toku Nishio, actor and voice actor (born 1939)
 August 12: Teruo Ishii, film director (born 1924)
 November 4: Hiro Takahashi, singer, lyricist, and composer (born 1964)
 November 4: Mana Nishiura, drummer (born 1971)
 November 6: Minako Honda, idol pop star and singer (born 1967)
 November 22: Airi Kinoshita, murder victim (born 1998)
 November 25: Yoshio Shiga, fighter ace (born 1914)
 November 26: Takanori Arisawa, composer and arranger (born 1951)
 Undated: Masao Sasakibara, fighter ace (born 1921)

See also
 2005 in Japanese television
 List of Japanese films of 2005

Statistics
 Wealthiest person in Japan: Nobutada Saji (net worth US$5.8 billion)

References

 
Years of the 21st century in Japan
Japan
Japan